The Escanaba River is a  river on the Upper Peninsula of the U.S. state of Michigan.

In his poem The Song of Hiawatha, Henry Wadsworth Longfellow describes how Hiawatha "crossed the rushing Esconaba".  It is a wide river that cuts into limestone beds. The upper river is rocky and scenic and supports brook, brown and some rainbow trout throughout along with warmwater species in the impoundments.  John D. Voelker, writing as Robert Traver, authored fishing stories set on the Escanaba in Trout Madness.

The East Branch and the Middle Branch of the Escanaba converge in the town of Gwinn to form the main stem. The stretch from this convergence south to the Delta County line is mostly wide and smooth, ideal for a canoe trip. Dams on the river's branches require caution, however.

Geology 
The Escanaba River watershed is one of the largest watersheds in Michigan’s Upper Peninsula totaling 924 square miles and has 508 miles of streams that flow year round. This watershed starts in west central Marquette County, north of Lake Michigan, and flows southeast to Lake Michigan at Little Bay de Noc. The name of this large river system and the community of Escanaba were derived from an Ojibwa (Chippewa) Indian word meaning “flat rock.” The majority of the limestone bedrock waterfalls found near Lake Michigan have been impounded for power generation and/or paper making.

References

Rivers of Michigan
Rivers of Delta County, Michigan
Tributaries of Lake Michigan